This article is a comparison of notable business integration and business process automation software.

General

Scope
Scope of this comparison:
 Service-oriented architecture implementations;
 Message-oriented middleware and message brokers;
 Enterprise service bus implementations;
 BPEL implementations;
 Enterprise application integration software.

General information

Compatibility and interoperability

Operating system support

Hardware support

Supported hardware depends on supported operating systems.

Database support

Web servers support

See also
 List of application servers
 List of BPEL engines
 List of BPMN 2.0 engines

Notes

Footnotes

References
 Daryl C. Plummer, David W. McCoy, Charles Abrams. Magic Quadrant for the Integrated Service Environment Market, 2006. Gartner, research G00137074.

Software comparisons

Enterprise application integration